Barbara Grantmyre was a Canadian writer. Born Barbara Lucas, she is known for several works of nonfiction including Lunar Rogue (1963) about the criminal Henry More Smith and The River that Missed the Boat (1975) about the Shubenacadie Canal. She also wrote short stories including a collection published as A Rose for Minnie Mullet in 1964. She was a contemporary of Thomas Raddall.

Her husband was Thomas Grantmyre and they lived in Elmsdale, Nova Scotia. She had four children - Merrit, Gretchen, Leigh and Brenda.

Barbara also wrote several short stories including the Christmas Goose.

References

External links
 List of works and collections

Writers from Nova Scotia
Year of birth missing
Year of death missing